Tom Bullock (1872–1964) was a Black American bartender in the pre-Prohibition era.

He was born in Louisville, Kentucky, on October 18, 1872, one of at least three children of Thomas Bullock, his father, a former slave who fought for the Union Army, according to US Census records.

Bullock was a bartender at the Pendennis Club, the Kenton Club, and most notably the St. Louis Country Club, and is the first known African-American author to publish a cocktail manual, The Ideal Bartender.  His book is notable as one of the last cocktail manuals published before Prohibition, providing a rare view onto pre-Prohibition cocktail recipes and drinking culture in America.  He appears to have ceased bartending with the onset of Prohibition.

Bullock was known to be a bartender and friend to George Herbert Walker, who wrote an introduction to his cocktail manual, writing "It is a genuine privilege to be permitted to testify to his qualifications for such a work." In 1913, he was involved in a libel case when ex-President Theodore Roosevelt sued for alleged libel regarding his drinking habits, and asserted he had only had a few sips of a mint julep cocktail made by Bullock.  The St. Louis Post-Dispatch disputed Roosevelt's claim, asserting that no one could fail to finish one of Bullock's cocktails.

Bullock died in 1964.

Cocktail historian David Wondrich believes that Bullock may have been one of the first bartenders to create a variant of the gimlet, the Stone Sour.

References 

1872 births
1964 deaths
American bartenders
People from Louisville, Kentucky
19th-century African-American people
20th-century African-American people